Eléona Uhl (born Eléona Milanizadeh) is an Austrian-born Swiss writer, who writes primarily in French. She was born in 1961 in Austria to an Austrian mother and Iranian father. The family moved to Switzerland when Eleona was three years old, at first living in the Swiss Jura and then in the canton of Vaud. Uhl now lives in Vevey. 

In 1993, she was lauded by the Société des artistes et poètes de France for Sospiro. The following year, she won a short story prize for "Page blanche". She has written two novels, Schlott (2016) and Sans Elle (2013).

References

Swiss writers
1961 births
Living people